Lincoln School may refer to:

Nepal 
Lincoln School, Kathmandu, Nepal

United Kingdom 
 Lincoln Grammar School was a boys' grammar and boarding school on Wragby Road in Lincoln, Lincolnshire which in 1974 became Lincoln Christ's Hospital School, a co-educational comprehensive school
 Lincoln School of Art became part of De Montfort University in 1994, then part of the University of Lincoln in 2001

United States

Alabama 
Lincoln School (Huntsville, Alabama), listed on the National Register of Historic Places (NRHP)
Lincoln Normal School, a middle school in Marion, Alabama

California 
Lincoln School (Paso Robles, California), listed on the NRHP in San Luis Obispo County, California

Colorado 
Lincoln School (Erie, Colorado), listed on the NRHP in Weld County, Colorado
Lincoln School (Fort Morgan, Colorado), listed on the NRHP
Lincoln School (La Junta, Colorado), listed on the NRHP in Colorado

Idaho 
Lincoln School (Twin Falls, Idaho), listed on the NRHP in Idaho

Illinois 
Abraham Lincoln School for Social Science (Chicago, Illinois), defunct social workers school
Lincoln School (Rock Island, Illinois), listed on the NRHP

Iowa 
Lincoln School (Davenport, Iowa), listed on the NRHP
Lincoln School (Farley, Iowa), listed on the NRHP
Lincoln School (Oskaloosa, Iowa), listed on the NRHP

Kansas 
Lincoln School (Atchison, Kansas), listed on the NRHP in Kansas
Lincoln School (Newton, Kansas), listed on the NRHP in Kansas

Kentucky 
Lincoln School (Paducah, Kentucky), listed on the NRHP in Kentucky

Maine 
Lincoln School (Acton, Maine), listed on the NRHP

Massachusetts 
Lincoln School (Winchester, Massachusetts), listed on the NRHP in Massachusetts

Michigan 
Lincoln School (Iron River, Michigan), listed on the NRHP in Michigan

Minnesota 
Lincoln School (Eveleth, Minnesota), a former elementary school, now home to the East Range Developmental Achievement Center
Lincoln School Building (Virginia, Minnesota), listed on the NRHP

Missouri 
Lincoln School (Canton, Missouri), listed on the NRHP
Lincoln School (Springfield, Missouri), listed on the NRHP
Lincoln School (Vandalia, Missouri), listed on the NRHP

Montana 
Lincoln School (Missoula, Montana), listed on the NRHP in Montana

New York 
Lincoln School (Hornell, New York), listed on the NRHP
Lincoln School for Nurses, New York City, New York, a private nursing school in The Bronx (1898–1961)
New Lincoln School, New York City, New York, a private school in Manhattan (1948–1988)

Oregon 
Lincoln High School (Portland, Oregon)

Rhode Island 
Lincoln School (Providence, Rhode Island)

South Dakota 
Lincoln School (Belle Fourche, South Dakota), listed on the NRHP in South Dakota
Lincoln School No. 12 in Meckling, South Dakota, listed on the NRHP in South Dakota

Tennessee 
Lincoln School (Pikeville, Tennessee), listed on the NRHP

Wisconsin 
Lincoln School (Madison, Wisconsin), listed on the NRHP in Wisconsin
Lincoln School (Racine, Wisconsin), listed on the NRHP
Lincoln School (Shawano, Wisconsin), listed on the NRHP

Wyoming 
Lincoln School (Laramie, Wyoming), listed on the NRHP

Schools with related names

Schools named Lincoln Middle School 
Lincoln County Middle School (disambiguation), multiple schools
Lincoln Middle School (disambiguation), multiple schools

K-8 schools 
 Abraham Lincoln Elementary School, Chicago, Illinois
 Lincoln School in Brookline, Massachusetts
 Lincoln Public Schools, Lincoln, Massachusetts
 Lincoln Public Schools, Nebraska

See also 
 Lincoln High School (disambiguation)
 Lincoln Elementary School (disambiguation)
 Lincoln College (disambiguation)
 Lincoln University (disambiguation)
 Asociación Escuelas Lincoln, Buenos Aires, Argentina
 Lincoln-Way Community High School District